Godfred Bekoé  (born 12 November 1992) is a Ghanaian professional footballer who plays as a forward for Championnat National 2 club Haguenau.

External links

Godfred Bekoé at cfd.com.cy

Living people
1992 births
Footballers from Kumasi
Ghanaian footballers
Ghanaian expatriate footballers
Association football forwards
RC Strasbourg Alsace players
En Avant Guingamp players
SC Schiltigheim players
Olympiakos Nicosia players
PFC Chernomorets Burgas players
CS Gaz Metan Mediaș players
FCSR Haguenau players
Championnat National 2 players
First Professional Football League (Bulgaria) players
Liga I players
Cypriot Second Division players
Ghanaian expatriate sportspeople in Cyprus
Ghanaian expatriate sportspeople in Bulgaria
Ghanaian expatriate sportspeople in Romania
Ghanaian expatriate sportspeople in France
Expatriate footballers in Cyprus
Expatriate footballers in Bulgaria
Expatriate footballers in Romania
Expatriate footballers in France